The 2011–12 Liga Nacional de Ascenso de Honduras season will be the 33rd season of the Liga Nacional de Ascenso de Honduras, the second division of football in Honduras. It will be contested by 28 teams divided into two zones with two divisions each.

The season is split into two separate tournaments, the Apertura and the Clausura. At the end, the winners of both competitions will face off against each other in order to determine the team which will earn promotion to the First division for the 2012–13 season.

2011–12 teams

Apertura
The Apertura tournament started on 12 August 2011.

Regular season

Results

Quarterfinals

Real Sociedad vs UPNFM

 Real Sociedad won 4–3 on aggregate.

Hispano vs Social Sol

 Hispano won 3–2 on aggregate.

Juticalpa vs Parrillas One

 Parrillas One won 4–3 on aggregate.

Atlético Municipal vs Atlético Pinares

 Atlético Municipal won 10–0 on aggregate.

Semifinals

Real Sociedad vs Parrillas One

 Real Sociedad won 5–1 on aggregate score.

Hispano vs Atlético Municipal

 Hispano 3–3 Atlético Municipal on aggregate score; Atlético Municipal won 5–4 on penalty shootouts.

Final

Real Sociedad vs Atlético Municipal

 Real Sociedad won 4–0 on aggregate score.

Clausura

Parrillas One defeated Real Sociedad on aggregate score.

Promotion
Played between C.D. Real Sociedad (winners of Apertura) and Parrillas One (winners of Clausura).

References

2011–12 in Honduran football
Hon
Honduran Liga Nacional de Ascenso seasons